The House of Peril is a 1922 British silent drama film directed by Kenelm Foss and starring Fay Compton, Roy Travers, Flora le Breton and A.B. Imeson. It is an adaptation of the 1912 novel The Chink in the Armour by Marie Belloc Lowndes and the subsequent stage play adaptation by Horace Annesley Vachell. The film follows Sylvia Bailey, a wealthy widow who travels to a French gambling resort where she encounters assorted characters.

Plot
In Deauville a German couple lure girl gamblers to a 'haunted' house and kill them for their jewels.

Cast
 Fay Compton as Sylvia Bailey
 Roy Travers as Bill Chester
 A.B. Imeson as Comte de Virieu
 Flora le Breton as French Maid
 Madeline Seymour as Anna Wolsky
 Wallace Bosco as Polperro
 Nelson Ramsey as Herr Wachner
 Irene Tripod as Frau Wachner
 Blanche Walker as Maid
 George Bellamy as Gambler
 Hubert Carter as Gambler
 Jeff Barlow as Gambler
 Lewis Gilbert as Gambler
 Tom Coventry as Gambler
 Madge Tree as Gambler

References

External links

1922 films
Films based on British novels
Films based on works by Marie Adelaide Belloc Lowndes
Films directed by Kenelm Foss
1922 drama films
British drama films
British silent feature films
Films set in France
British black-and-white films
1920s English-language films
1920s British films
Silent drama films